Bonnie Bryant (born October 5, 1943) is an American professional golfer who played on the LPGA Tour. She is the only player in LPGA Tour history to win a tournament left-handed.

Bryant was born in Tulare, California. She did not take up golf until age 20, learning from Vic Lombardi, a National League pitcher for Brooklyn and Pittsburgh. Prior to taking up golf, she played five years of AAA-fast pitch softball.

Bryant joined the LPGA Tour in 1971. She won once on the LPGA Tour. Her win came at the 1974 Bill Branch LPGA Classic in Fort Myers, Florida. She shot a 7-under-par, 209 to claim the $5,700 first prize. She also lost to Nancy Lopez in a five-way sudden death playoff at the 1979 Coca-Cola Classic.

Professional wins (1)

LPGA Tour wins (1)

LPGA Tour playoff record (0–1)

References

Notes

External links

American female golfers
LPGA Tour golfers
Golfers from California
Left-handed golfers
People from Tulare, California
1943 births
Living people